Saint-Félix-de-Valois is a municipality in the Lanaudière region of Quebec, Canada, part of the Matawinie Regional County Municipality.

Quebec author Réjean Ducharme, recipient of several Governor General's Awards, was born in Saint-Félix-de-Valois in 1942.

History
Historically it was part of the Berthier Seignory. Circa 1830, a small group of pioneers from England, Scotland, and Ireland started to colonize the place. In 1840, the Mission of Saint-Félix-de-Valois was formed and soon after in 1844 it became a parish when it separated from the Sainte-Élisabeth Parish. It was named after Felix of Valois.

In 1845, the Parish Municipality of Saint-Félix-de-Valois was first established, but abolished two years later. In 1851, its post office opened. In 1855, the parish municipality was reestablished.

In 1926, the main village, also known as Saint-Félix-de-Valois, was incorporated as a separate Village Municipality. On December 24, 1997, the parish municipality and the village municipality were reunited into the new Municipality of Saint-Félix-de-Valois.

Demographics

Population

Private dwellings occupied by usual residents: 3057 (total dwellings: 3190)

Language
Mother tongue:
 English as first language: 0.9%
 French as first language: 97.5%
 English and French as first language: 0.6%
 Other as first language: 1%

Education
Commission scolaire des Samares is the French school board.
 École secondaire de l'Érablière
 École des Moulins (Saint-Félix-de-Valois)
 pavillon Notre-Dame
 pavillon Sainte-Marguerite

Sir Wilfrid Laurier School Board serves as the English school board.
 Joliette Elementary School in Saint-Charles-Borromée
 Joliette High School in Joliette

Notable residents
 Peter B. Champagne, American businessman and politician
 Michel Vaillancourt, silver medalist at the 1976 Olympics in equestrian

See also
List of municipalities in Quebec

References

External links

Incorporated places in Lanaudière
Municipalities in Quebec
Matawinie Regional County Municipality